Merica elegans, common name the elegant nutmeg, is a species of sea snail, a marine gastropod mollusk in the family Cancellariidae, the nutmeg snails.

Description
The size of the shell varies between 22 mm and 43 mm.

Distribution
This marine species occurs off the Philippines, Indonesia and Western Thailand; also off Australia (Queensland)

References

 Sowerby, G.B. (1st) & Sowerby, J. (ill.) 1822. The genera of Recent and Fossil shells. London : Sowerby pts 2–13.
 Crosse, H. 1861. Etude sur le genre Cancellaire, suivie du catalogue des espèces vivantes et fossiles actuellement connues. Journal de Conchyliologie 9: 220–256 
 Löbbecke, T. 1881. Das genus Cancellaria. Systematisches Conchylien-Cabinet von Martini und Chemnitz (309): 1–16, pls 1–5 
 Garrard, T.A. 1975. A revision of Australian Cancellariidae (Gastropoda: Mollusca). Records of the Australian Museum 30: 1–62 
 Tantanasiriwong, R. 1978. An illustrated checklist of marine shelled gastropods from Phuket Island, adjacent mainland and offshore islands, Western Peninsula, Thailand. Phuket Marine Biological Center, Research Bulletin 21: 1–22, 259 figs
 Springsteen, F.J. & Leobrera, F.M. 1986. Shells of the Philippines. Manila : Carfel Seashell Museum 377 pp., 100 pls.
 Verhecken, A. 1986. The recent Cancellariidae of Indonesia (Neogastropoda, Cancellariacea). Gloria Maris 25(2): 29–66
 Wilson, B. 1994. Australian Marine Shells. Prosobranch Gastropods. Kallaroo, WA : Odyssey Publishing Vol. 2 370 pp. 
 Verhecken A. 1997. Mollusca Gastropoda: Arafura Sea Cancellariidae collected during the Karubar cruise. Mémoires du Muséum National d'Histoire Naturelle 172: 295-323-page(s): 307

External links
 

Cancellariidae
Gastropods described in 1822